Bojan Kusmuk (born September 12, 1969) is a Serbian basketball coach and former player.

Playing career 
Kusmuk played for Sloga, Swisslion Vršac, Hemofarm, Beobanka, BFC Beočin, Vojvodina, Mašinac of the YUBA League. He also played in Montenegro (Primorka Bar), Israel (Elitzur Givat Shmuel), Belgium (Blue Fox Gent) and Bosnia and Herzegovina. During a stint with BFC Beočin, he played the 1995–96 FIBA Korać Cup season. Over two cup games, he averaged 16.5 points, 2.0 rebounds and 1.0 assists per game.

Coaching career 
Kusmuk worked as a head coach for teams such as Sloga, Velika Plana, and Napredak Kruševac. Also, he coached BCMUS Argeș Pitești of the Romanian Liga Națională, Slavija of the Basketball Championship of Bosnia and Herzegovina and the Al Ittihad Tripoli of the Libyan League.

In March 2015, he became the head coach for Dynamic BG of the Second Basketball League of Serbia. He got fired in February 2016.

On November 8, 2017, Kusmuk was named the head coach for Radnički of the Basketball League of Serbia.

On December 15, 2018, Kusmuk became the head coach for Gradina Srebrenik of the Bosnia and Herzegovina Championship. In March 2019, Gradina parted ways with him.

References

External links
 Player Profile at eurobasket.com
 Coach Profile at eurobasket.com

1969 births
Living people
KK BFC players
KK Beobanka players
KK Hemofarm players
KK Mašinac players
KK Sloga players
KK Vojvodina players
KK Lions/Swisslion Vršac players
KK Dynamic coaches
KK Plana coaches
KK Napredak Kruševac coaches
KKK Radnički coaches
KK Sloga coaches
Serbian men's basketball coaches
Serbian expatriate basketball people in Bosnia and Herzegovina
Serbian expatriate basketball people in Belgium
Serbian expatriate basketball people in Israel
Serbian expatriate basketball people in Libya
Serbian expatriate basketball people in Montenegro
Serbian expatriate basketball people in Romania
Serbian men's basketball players
Sportspeople from Kraljevo
Guards (basketball)